William Stewart (born 1910 or 1911 - died 1979) was a unionist politician in Northern Ireland.

Stewart studied at a technical college and ran before becoming a company director. For most of his life he owned a chemist/grocer's, Stewart & Chapmans based on Church St in Dungannon, Co. Tyrone. He joined the Ulster Unionist Party and was elected to the Senate of Northern Ireland in 1957, serving until its abolition in 1973.  From 1960 to 1962, he was a Deputy Speaker of the Senate and also served as chairman of Dungannon Urban District Council.

References

External links
Reference to the "late Senator William Stewart"
Reference to Senator William Stewart as Chairman of the Urban District Council

1910s births

Year of birth uncertain
Year of death missing
Members of the Senate of Northern Ireland 1957–1961
Members of the Senate of Northern Ireland 1961–1965
Members of the Senate of Northern Ireland 1965–1969
Members of the Senate of Northern Ireland 1969–1973
Ulster Unionist Party members of the Senate of Northern Ireland
Councillors in County Tyrone